Michael Copon is an American actor and producer. He is known for playing Felix Taggaro in the television series One Tree Hill, Vin Keahi in the television series Beyond the Break, and Lucas Kendall in Power Rangers Time Force.

Early life
Copon was born and raised in Chesapeake, Virginia. His father is Filipino. He graduated from Deep Creek High School in 2000.

Career
In 2001, Copon was as the Blue Power Ranger, Lucas Kendall, on the Power Rangers Time Force television series. He reprised this role in two episodes of Power Rangers Wild Force. In 2004, he appeared in a music video for the song "Backflip" by Raven-Symoné which was directed by Sanaa Hamri. Copon portrayed the recurring character Felix Taggaro on the television series One Tree Hill. From 2006 to 2009, Copon recurred on the drama series Beyond the Break on The N network. In between that time (in 2005) he appeared (and subsequently won) the competition on VH1's But Can They Sing?

In 2008, Copon played the love interest of Ashley Benson in straight-to-video movie Bring It On: In It to Win It.  Copon followed this up in 2008 playing the titular role in straight-to-video movie The Scorpion King 2: Rise of a Warrior.

On September 8, 2010, Copon released "Let's Get Nasty" on iTunes and in the same year he appeared on a TV commercial ad as a spokesperson for an Asian TV station foundation called Bantay Bata. Copon starred in the thriller Killer Holiday, and he also produced and did stunts in the film. Copon is also a member of the Hollywood Knights celebrity basketball team which raises funds for various schools and charitable organizations in the Greater Los Angeles area.

In summer 2012, Copon started co-hosting a weekend radio show on Positive Hit Radio the Current, WJLZ 88.5 FM, in Virginia with Trina Olson called Saturday Night with Trina & Mike.  The show airs Saturday nights from 5PM to 10PM ET and features Christian rock and hip hop music. The show is streamed live on the station's webpage.

Copon is executive producer of Michael Copon Studios.

Filmography

Film

Television

Video games
 Power Rangers Time Force (2001) as Blue Ranger

As a producer
 Killer Holiday (2013) – Producer
 Fearless (2015) – Producer

References

External links

1982 births
American film producers
American male film actors
American male television actors
American stunt performers
Living people
Male actors from Virginia
American male actors of Filipino descent
People from Chesapeake, Virginia
Participants in American reality television series
Singing talent show winners
21st-century American singers
21st-century American male singers